Sir Edward Hoare, 2nd Baronet (14 March 1745 – 30 April 1814) was an Anglo-Irish politician.

He was the son of Sir Joseph Hoare, 1st Baronet and Catherine Somerville and was commissioned as an officer in the service of the 13th Light Dragoons, eventually attaining the rank of captain.

He was elected to the Irish House of Commons as the Member of Parliament for Carlow Borough, sitting between 1768 and 1776. He was later elected MP for Banagher in 1790, sitting until 1798, and was again elected for the same constituency later in the year, sitting until 1800.

He succeeded to his father's baronetcy on 24 December 1801. He married Clotilda Wallis, the daughter of William Wallis, on 14 September 1771 and together they had three children.

References

1745 births
1814 deaths
Baronets in the Baronetage of Ireland
18th-century Anglo-Irish people
Irish MPs 1769–1776
Irish MPs 1790–1797
Irish MPs 1798–1800
Members of the Parliament of Ireland (pre-1801) for County Carlow constituencies
Members of the Parliament of Ireland (pre-1801) for King's County constituencies